Swapnil Bandodkar is a Marathi playback singer from India, popular for playback singing Marathi film and television world. He learnt music from Kunda Vaishampayan, Vasantrao Kulkarni and Suresh Wadkar

Career
Born in a Goan family in Mumbai. He has given performances in television, and various festivals in light and film music. He got nominated for Gadbad Gondhal in Ambarnath Film Festival in 2017 as Best Singer (Male). He was a contestant and winner of the first season of Sa Re Ga Ma in 2005.

Film singing
 Chashme Bahaddar (2006)
 Yanda Kartavya Aahe
 Photocopy
 Kshan (2006)
 Timepass
 Lai Bhaari(2014)
 Zabardast
 Morya
 Jai Maharashtra Dhaba Bhatinda
 Zenda
 Sharyat
 Zapatlela 2
 Happy Journey
 Premachi Goshta
 Mitwaa
 Poshter Boyz
 Gadbad Gondhal
 Panipat
 The Kashmir Files

Popular songs
 राधा हि बावरी Radha Hi Bavari
 गालावर खळी Galavar khali
 ओल्या सांजवेळी उन्हे Olya Sanjveli Unhe
 आला होळीचा सण लई भारी Aala Holicha San Lai Bhari
 का कळेना कोणत्या Ka Kalena Konatya 
 मंद मंद करी धुंद धुंद हा Mand Mand kari Dhund Dhund Ha
 गणाधीशा Ganadhisha
 बाप्पा मोरया मोरया रे Bappa Moraya re 
 घन आज बरसे मनावर Ghan Aaj Barse Manavar 
 परी म्हणू की सुंदरा Pari Mhanu Ki Sundara 
 मला वेड लागले प्रेमाचे Mala Ved Lagale Premache 
 लख लख चंदेरी Lakh Lakh Chanderi
 वादळवाट Vadalvaat 
 सारेगमप SaReGaMaPa 
 सांग ना रे मना Sang Na Re Mana 
 हा चंद्र तुझ्यासाठी Ha Chandra Tujhya Sathi
 दुर दुर चालली Dur dur chalali
 जीव गुंतला तुझ्यात Jeev guntala tuzyat
 उनाड पाऊस Unad paus
 स्वप्नातली तू परी Swapnatali Tu Pari
 जुळून येती रेशीमगाठी Julun Yeti Reshimgathi
 सावर रे एकदा, सावर रे Savar Re Ekda, Savar Re
 का सांग ना  Ka Sang na
 ऐकावी वाटते स्पर्शातली Aikavi Vatate Sparshatali
 तू जिथे मी तिथे Tu Jithe Mi Tithe
 मला सांग ना रे मना  Mala Sang Na Re Mana 
 ही तुझी जादूगरी Hi Tujhi Jadugiri
 हे काय होते Hey Kay Hote

Awards
  The best singer award for his solo song 'Phulpakharu' from the movie Timepass

Albums
 Jai Shri Krishna
 Mazhi Gaani – Swapnil Bandodkar vol 1
 Mazhi Gaani – Swapnil Bandodkarvol 2
 Bedhund
 Swapnanchya Gavi Java
 Tula Pahatana
 Mannmor
 Tichya Dolyatal Gaav
 Deep Chilo
 Tu Mazha Kinara
 Prasanna Ho Ambikem
 Sang Sang Ho Tum
 Tula Pahile
 Bappa Moraya re

References

External links
 

Marathi playback singers
Marathi-language singers
Living people
Singers from Mumbai
Goan people
Konkani-language singers
Year of birth missing (living people)